Wheeling Township is one of 29 townships in Cook County, Illinois, USA.  As of the 2010 census, its population was 153,630. It is the northeasternmost and most populated of the six northwest Cook County townships that form the panhandle.

Geography

Cities, towns, villages
 Arlington Heights
 Buffalo Grove
 Des Plaines (northwestern edge)
 Glenview
 Mount Prospect (northern edge)
 Northbrook
 Palatine (east of Hwy 53)
 Prospect Heights (vast majority)
 Rolling Meadows
 Wheeling (vast majority)

Adjacent townships
 Vernon Township, Lake County (north)
 West Deerfield Township, Lake County (northeast)
 Northfield Township (east)
 Maine Township (southeast)
 Elk Grove Township (south)
 Palatine Township (west)
 Ela Township, Lake County (northwest)

Cemeteries
The township contains these seven cemeteries: English, Memory Gardens, Randhill Park, Saint Marys, Saint Pauls Evangelical Lutheran, Shalom Memorial Park and Wheeling.

Major highways
  U.S. Route 12
  U.S. Route 14
  U.S. Route 45
  Illinois Route 21
  Illinois Route 68
  Illinois Route 83

Airports and landing strips
 Chicago Executive Airport

Lakes
 Potawatomi Lake

Landmarks
 Hersey High School
 Prospect High School
 Buffalo Grove High School
 Wheeling High School

Demographics

Political districts
 Illinois's 8th congressional district
 Illinois's 9th congressional district
 Illinois's 10th congressional district
 State House District 53
 State House District 57
 State House District 59
 State House District 66
 State Senate District 27
 State Senate District 29
 State Senate District 30
 State Senate District 33
- Elected Officials
Jeff Battinus - Trustee 
Brian Medley - Trustee
Ruth O'Connell - Trustee
Kathy Penner - Supervisor
Jerry Sadler - Assessor 
JoAnne Schultz - Trustee
Joanna Gauza - Clerk

References
 
 United States Census Bureau 2007 TIGER/Line Shapefiles
 United States National Atlas

External links
 Wheeling Township official website
 City-Data.com
 Illinois State Archives
 Township Officials of Illinois
 Cook County official site

Townships in Cook County, Illinois
Townships in Illinois